Altitude FC may refer to:

 Altitude FC (Belize), a Belizean football team
 Altitude FC (Canada), a Canadian soccer team

See also:
 Placencia Assassins FC (Belize), a Belizean football team who formed a one-year merger with the Belizean Altitude FC and competed as Altitude Assassins FC